The  is an AC electric multiple unit type operated on limited express services by Kyushu Railway Company (JR Kyushu) in Japan since July 1992.

Design
The trains were built jointly by Hitachi and Kinki Sharyo.

Formations

7-car sets (BM1–11, BM13–14) (2004-2011)
The 7-car sets are formed as follows.

Cars 2 and 7 are each fitted with one PS400K scissors-type pantograph.

6-car sets (BM1-14, BM115)
The two 6-car sets are formed as follows.

Cars 2 and 6 are each fitted with one PS400K scissors-type pantograph.

4-car sets (BM101–BM111)
The 11 4-car sets are formed as follows.

Car 3 is fitted with one PS400K scissors-type pantograph.

Operations
As of March 2011, the 787 series are used on the following limited express services.
 Ariake
 Kirameki
 Kaiō
 Kamome
 Midori
 Nichirin
 Hyuga
 Kirishima
 Sendai Express

Former operations
 Relay Tsubame (2004–2011)

From the start of the revised timetable on 12 March 2011, with the completion of the Kyushu Shinkansen, 787 series sets were no longer used on Relay Tsubame services. The T1 (SaHa 787) cars were removed from the 7-car sets to form a fleet of 15 6-car sets. These were redeployed on Kamome services, displacing the earlier 783 series EMUs.

Joyful Train sets

 36 + 3: A modified six-car set, which had been planned for service in to begin on 15 October 2020. based at Minami-Fukuoka Depot.

History
All cars were made no-smoking from the start of the revised timetable on 18 March 2007.

See also
TGV Reseau,train design that inspires 787 series

References

Electric multiple units of Japan
Kyushu Railway Company
Hitachi multiple units
Train-related introductions in 1992
Kinki Sharyo multiple units
20 kV AC multiple units